Eumimesis heilipoides is a species of beetle in the family Cerambycidae. It was described by Henry Walter Bates in 1866. It is known from Brazil, French Guiana, Peru and Ecuador.

References

Calliini
Beetles described in 1866